Derek Chang or Chang Hsuan-jui (born 17 December 1992) is a Taiwanese actor. He is known for his role as Du Zhe-ming in the hit TV series Prince of Wolf (2016). In 2018, He was also nominated for the Best Leading Actor in a TV Series at the 53rd Golden Bell Awards for his performance in My Dear Boy.

Early life 
Derek was born on 17 December 1992 in Taipei, Taiwan

In 2015, Derek decided to donate 45% of his liver to his father who had liver cancer. After the operation, he lived a light diet and exercised frequently until the body recovered.

Career

2016–2017: Beginnings as new actor
In 2016, Derek rose to national and regional prominence overnight for his role as Zhe Ming ("Little Wolf") in the hit TV series Prince of Wolf. Prince of Wolf enjoyed unprecedented success in East and Southeast Asian countries. He was called as "National Little Brother" or "National Boyfriend".
In the same year, Chang appeared in highly rated TV series Stay with Me which stars with Joe Chen, Wang Kai in the play as Joe Chen's younger brother.

In May 2017, Derek played the leading role in "My Dear Boy" with Ruby Lin. For his performance, he was nominated at 53rd Golden Bell Awards for Best Leading Actor in a TV Series.

2019–present: Rising popularity

In 2019, Chang he participated in the mainland Mango TV program "Meeting Mr. Right" and officially interacted with Selina Jen

In 2019, Chang starred in the family drama Yong-Jiu Grocery Store, based on comic by Yan Guangmin. The drama was a success and achieved a cult following. It has a score of 8.5 points on Douban

Filmography

Film

Television series

Reality show

Awards and nominations

References

External links

 
 
 

1992 births
Living people
21st-century Taiwanese male actors
Taiwanese male television actors
Taiwanese male film actors
Taiwanese male models
Male actors from Taipei
Taiwanese television presenters